This is a list of 212 species in the genus Hister.

Hister species

References